Jens Friedenreich Hage (6 October 1752 - 17 June 1831)  was a Danish merchant and landowner.

Early life
Hage was born on 6 October 1752 in Stege on the island of Møn, the eldest child of Johannes Jensen Hage and Bolette Margrethe Friedenreich.  The Hage family was of Dutch origins and had counted merchants at least since the 17th century. He was the elder brother of Christopher Friedenreich Hage.

Career
On 11 July 1765, Hage passed his exams as a helmsman. In 1777 he moved to the Danish West Indies where he made a fortune as a merchant and plantation owner. He was the owner of the plantation Frederikshaab on St, Croix. He also purchased the Clairfield estate in Pennsylvania, In 1790, he was back in Stege. In the late 1890s, he settled as a merchant in Copenhagen. He traded under the name J. F. Hage & Co. in spite of the fact that he had no partners.

In 1800, he  became chairman of Det Danske Fiskeriselskab. In 1801, he was sent on a confidential mission to the Danish West Indies with as Royal West Indian Government Commissioner (kgl. vestindisk regeringskommissær). On 2 May 1801, He was appointed to kommerceintendant with rank of justitsråd. As of 28 July  1815,

Personal life
 
Hage married twice, first to Gertrud Heitmann (29 December 1766 - 1 March 1801) and then to Marie Sophie Ruspini (c. 1783 - 16 January 1864). His first wife bore him 11 children, eight daughters and three sons:
 Margaretha Boletha Gertrud Hage (23 January 1785 - 18 August 1808)
 Maria Catharina Julia Hage (4 September 1786 - 20 May 1787)
 Maria Catharina Hage (13 December 1787 - 22 October 1811)
 Anna Sabina Henriette Hage (3 February 1789 - 5 March 1821)
 Johanne Frederikke Christiane Hage (1 March 1790 - 24 July  1847)
 Carolina Rebecca Hage (9 June 1791 - 26 February 1815)
 Edward Hage, (30 January 1793 - 1803)
 Martha Benedicte Hage (27 November 1794 - 27 March 1860)
 Johannes Philip Hage (18 October 1796 - 23 April 1803)
 Hother Hage (9 April 1800 - 27 June 1872)
 Eleonora Anastasia Hage (1804 - May 1831)

he was also active as a brewer in Copenhagen. He owned a country house at Frederiksdal and Benzonseje at Køge.

References

18th-century Danish businesspeople
19th-century Danish businesspeople
Danish merchants
18th-century Danish landowners
19th-century Danish landowners
People from Møn
Hage family
1752 births
1831 deaths